This article includes several ranked indicators for Chile's regions.

By area

Chilean regions by area.

Sources: "División Político Administrativa y Censal 2007", National Statistics Office, 2007 (Chile area data); CIA's The World Factbook (country area comparison).
Note: It does not include the Chilean Antarctic Territory, annexed to the Magallanes Region and totalling .

Population

By population

Chilean regions by population as of June 30, 2015.

Sources: National Statistics Office's September 2014 projections (Chile's population), accessed on 28 June 2015; UNDESA's World Population Prospects: The 2012 Revision, September 2013, accessed on 28 June 2015 (country comparison).

By urban and rural population

Chilean regions by their urban and rural population as of June 30, 2010.

Sources: National Statistics Office (Chile's population).

By population density

Chilean regions by population density as of 2010.

Sources: National Statistics Office (Chile area data, Chile's population); Wikipedia's List of countries and dependencies by population density (country comparison).
Note: It does not include the internationally unrecognized Chilean Antarctic Territory, annexed to the Magallanes and Antártica Chilena Region and totalling .

By number of households and household size

Chilean regions by number of households and household size in 2013.

Source: Casen Survey 2013, Ministry of Social Development of Chile.
Note: Data exclude live-in domestic workers and their family.

By indigenous population

Chilean regions by persons self-identifying as belonging to one of Chile's indigenous groups in 2013.

Source: Ministry of Social Development of Chile's 2013 Casen Survey.
a Easter Island—where the majority of the Rapanui people live—was not included in the survey.

By foreign nationals 

Chilean regions by number of foreign nationals and country/area of citizenship in 2017.

Source: Ministry of Social Development of Chile's 2017 Casen Survey.

Economy

By regional GDP (PPP)

Chilean regions by their 2014 regional gross domestic product at purchasing power parity in billions of 2014 international dollars.

Sources: Central Bank of Chile (Chile's 2014 Regional GDP in current prices), accessed on 9 April 2016. OECD's OECD.Stat (Chile's 2014 PPP conversion factor for GDP (375.432372)), accessed on 9 April 2016. World Bank's World Development Indicators (2014 GDP (PPP) for world countries), accessed on 9 April 2016.
Notes: The aggregate Regional GDP is less than the National GDP because it does not include extra-regio GDP, VAT taxes and import duties.

By regional GDP (PPP) per capita

Chilean regions by their 2014 regional gross domestic product per capita at purchasing power parity in 2014 international dollars.

Sources: Central Bank of Chile (Chile's 2014 Regional GDP in current prices), accessed on 9 April 2016. National Statistics Office of Chile (Chile's 2014 national and regional population), accessed on 9 April 2016. OECD's OECD.Stat (Chile's 2014 PPP conversion factor for GDP (375.432372)), accessed on 9 April 2016. World Bank's World Development Indicators (2014 GDP (PPP) per capita for world countries), accessed on 9 April 2016.

By main economic activity

Chilean regions by their principal economic activity in 2014.

Source: Central Bank of Chile (Chile's 2014 National and Regional GDP in current prices by economic activity), accessed on 9 April 2016.

By average net salary

Chilean regions by their average annual net salary in 2014 in international dollars.

By household income per capita

Chilean regions by their annual household income per capita in international dollars in 2013.

By household income inequality

Chilean regions by their household income inequality in 2013 as measured by the Gini coefficient.

By absolute poverty rate

Chilean regions by percentage of the regional population living below the national poverty line.

Source: 2013 Casen Survey, Ministry of Social Development of Chile.
Note: A household is below the national poverty line if its monthly total income (self-generated income plus government cash transfers plus owner-imputed rent income) divided by its household size to the power of 0.7 is below CLP$136,911 (in November 2013 prices). The consumption patterns used to construct the poverty line are from 2011 to 2012. Live-in domestic workers and their family are not included.

By relative poverty rate

Chilean regions by percentage of regional population living below 40%, 50% and 60% of regional median equivalised income. Data are for 2011.

Sources: Ministry of Social Development of Chile's Casen Survey 2011 (monthly monetary income); OECD's StatExtracts database (2011 PPP for actual individual consumption).
Notes: Income is the median of monthly household monetary income (self-generated income plus government cash transfers) divided by the square root of household size, excluding live-in domestic workers and their family. The result is multiplied by 12 and divided by the "PPP for actual individual consumption" for 2011 (425.368652) to obtain annual income in International dollars.

Health

By average lifespan

Chilean regions by the average lifespan (age of death) in years in 2002. This should not be confused with life expectancy.

Source: "Demografía: Ganancias en años de vida y riesgo de muerte, 1992-2002." National Statistics Office.

By life expectancy

Chilean regions by life expectancy at birth, by sex, in 2015.

Source: "Enfoque demográfico de género, July 2015," National Statistics Office.

Education

By literacy rate

Chilean regions by literacy rate in persons over 15 years of age.

Sources: Casen Survey 2009, 2011, and 2013, Ministry of Social Development of Chile.

By mean years of schooling 

Chilean regions by the average years of school completed successfully in persons over 15 years of age in 2011.

Source: Casen Survey 2011, Ministry of Social Development of Chile.

By level of educational attainment 

Chilean regions by highest level of educational attainment in persons over 15 years of age in 2011.

Source: Casen Survey 2011, Ministry of Social Development of Chile.

By net enrollment ratio in education 

Chilean regions by net enrollment ratio in education in 2011.

Sources: Casen Survey 2011, Ministry of Social Development of Chile.
Note: Data exclude special education.

By gross enrollment ratio in education 

Chilean regions by gross enrollment ratio in education in 2011.

Sources: Casen Survey 2011, Ministry of Social Development of Chile.
Note: Data exclude special education.

Basic services

By access to drinking water 

Chilean regions by population living in homes with access to drinking water in 2011, by source.

Source: Casen Survey 2011, Ministry of Social Development of Chile.

By access to sewage treatment 

Chilean regions by population living in homes with access to house sewage treatment in 2011, by type.

Source: Casen Survey 2011, Ministry of Social Development of Chile.

By access to electricity 

Chilean regions by population living in homes with access to electricity in 2011, by source.

Source: Casen Survey 2011, Ministry of Social Development of Chile.

Ownership

By ownership of goods and services 

Chilean regions by percentage of households owning at least one car, an automatic washing machine, a refrigerator, a water heater, a fixed telephone line, a mobile phone and subscribed to cable/satellite television in 2011.

Source: Casen Survey 2011, Ministry of Social Development of Chile.
Note: Data refer to family nucleus, except "mobile phone" and "fixed telephone line" data, which refer to households.

By computer ownership and Internet access

Chilean regions by personal computer ownership and Internet access in 2011.

Although only households with personal computers were asked if they had Internet access, the percentages shown here for both indicators are in relation to the total households in each region.

Source: Casen Survey 2011, Ministry of Social Development of Chile.
Note: Data exclude mobile phone Internet access.

By mobile phone ownership

Chilean regions by population over the age of 15 owning a mobile phone in 2011.

Source: Casen Survey 2011, Ministry of Social Development of Chile.

By electorate 

Chilean regions by population registered to vote in the 28 October 2012 municipal election as of 30 June 2012 (registration deadline). Please note that Chileans born in Chile are automatically enrolled.

Note: "E/VAP ratio" is "Enrolled" divided by "Voting Age Population" multiplied by 100. The electoral roll includes all Chileans and foreigners (5-year residence) over the age of 18 on election day (28 October 2012) whose right to vote has not been suspended. The National Statistics Office provides population data estimated for June 30 of each year disaggregated by age. Linear interpolation was applied to obtain the population for election day (28 October 2012).
Sources: National Statistics Office (Chile's population), Electoral Service (electorate).

By prison inmates and incarceration rate

Chilean regions by prison inmates and incarceration rate as of November 30, 2010.

Note: Incarceration rate is number of inmates per 100,000 inhabitants.
Sources: Chilean Gendarmerie (prison inmates), National Statistics Office (Chile's population as of June 30, 2010), International Centre for Prison Studies, accessed on December 9, 2010 (country comparison).

By national HDI

Chilean regions by their human development index. This is an HDI constructed for Chile and it is not comparable to HDIs for other countries.

Source: "Desarrollo Humano en Chile - El poder: ¿para qué y para quién?." United Nations Development Programme, 2004.

By international HDI

Below is a list of the Chilean regions by Human Development Index as of 2021, which is a comparative measure of life expectancy, literacy, education, standard of living and overall well-being of the citizens in each states. All Chilean regions have a HDI higher than 0.785.

By population by settlement type

Chilean regions by their population living in cities (ciudades), towns (pueblos), villages (aldeas) and hamlets (caseríos), according to the 2002 census.

Source: "Chile: Ciudades, Pueblos, Aldeas y Caseríos 2005." National Statistics Office, June 2005.

By largest cities

Largest cities within a region, according to the 2002 census. In all regions, the largest city is also the regional capital.

Source: "Chile: Ciudades, Pueblos, Aldeas y Caseríos 2005." National Statistics Office, June 2005.

Other references

Ranked lists of country subdivisions
Regions, ranked
ranked
Geography-related lists of superlatives